Ian Gareth Butler (born 24 November 1981) is a New Zealand cricketer who has dual UK citizenship. Butler was born in Middlemore in the Auckland urban area. He has represented New Zealand in all three formats of the game internationally.

Domestic career
At the age of 17, he had his first professional contract with Penrith in Lake District. The following year, he played for Purley in London.

He played for Northern Districts between 2001 and 2008 before moving to Otago, representing them in the 2009 Champions League Twenty20 in India.

He had stints in English county cricket with Gloucestershire in 2003 and Kent in 2004.

In 2007 Butler played for Harborne Cricket Club in Birmingham, and coached some boys from King Edward's School Birmingham, Edgbaston. In 2008 he again played for Harborne Cricket Club, as well as Lashings Cricket Club in London.

He then re-signed for Gloucestershire in the 2010 Friends Provident t20 tournament. In 2014 Butler signed for Northamptonshire.

International career
Although overshadowed by express speedster Shane Bond, Butler's fast bowling has proved a potent force in itself. His ability to get lift from benign surfaces winning him a test best 6 for 46 against Pakistan in Wellington in 2004. Following a series of back injuries, he failed to establish himself as an automatic selection in an increasingly strong New Zealand side and has not appeared in first class cricket since December 2014 though he is still active in one day cricket for Northern Districts.

Butler was recalled to the New Zealand squad in early 2009, and played in a Twenty20 International against Australia in Sydney, going on to play in the 2009 and 2010 ICC World Twenty20 tournaments in England and the West Indies.

Retirement
In 2014, Butler announced his retirement from cricket. In January 2022, Butler accepted the role of Director of Cricket at C.I.Y.M.S. Cricket Club in Belfast, Northern Ireland.

References

External links

1981 births
Living people
Gloucestershire cricketers
Kent cricketers
New Zealand Test cricketers
New Zealand One Day International cricketers
New Zealand Twenty20 International cricketers
New Zealand cricketers
Northern Districts cricketers
Nottinghamshire cricketers
Otago cricketers
Northamptonshire cricketers
North Island cricketers